The New Mexico Legislature is the legislative branch of the state government of New Mexico. It is a bicameral body made up of the New Mexico House of Representatives and the New Mexico Senate.

History

The New Mexico Legislature was established when New Mexico officially became a state and was admitted to the union in 1912. 
In 1922, Bertha M. Paxton became the first woman elected to the New Mexico Legislature, serving one term in the House of Representatives.

Session structure and operations
The Legislature meets every year, in regular session on the third Tuesday in January. The New Mexico Constitution limits the regular session to 60 calendar days, every other year it is 30 days. The lieutenant governor presides over the Senate, while the Speaker of the House is elected from that body in a closed-door majority-member caucus. Both have wide latitude in choosing committee membership in their respective houses and have a large impact on lawmaking in the state.

While only the Governor can call the Legislature into special sessions, the Legislature can call itself into an extraordinary session. There is no limit on the number of special sessions a governor can call. The New Mexico Constitution does not limit the duration of each special session; lawmakers may consider only those issues designated by the governor in the "call," or proclamation convening the special session (though other issues may be added by the Governor during a session).

Any bill passed by the Legislature and signed by the governor takes effect 90 days after its passage unless two-thirds of each house votes to give the bill immediate effect, earlier effect (before 90 day period), or later effect (after 90 day period).

Compensation
New Mexico does not pay its legislators a base salary. Legislators receive per diem of $165 for work at the capitol or committee hearings during January and February, going up to $194 during March.

Qualifications
The state constitution requires representatives to be at least twenty-one years old and senators to be at least twenty-five, and members of both houses must live in the districts they represent.

Districting
The legislature consists of 70 representatives and 42 senators.  Each member of the House represents roughly 25,980 residents of New Mexico.  Each member of the Senate represents roughly 43,300 residents. Currently the Democratic Party holds a majority in both of the chambers of New Mexico Legislature, and holds the Governor's office.

Redistricting
In 2021, Senate Bill 304 established the Citizen Redistricting Committee. The committee is to develop three redistricting plans to recommend to the Legislature for each of the following: U.S. House of Representatives, New Mexico House of Representatives, New Mexico Senate, and any other state offices requiring redistricting. As of the summer of 2021, the latter consisted of only the New Mexico Public Education Commission. The Legislature is still free to make its own redistricting plans.

Term limits
Currently, there are no term limits for legislators. The longest current member of the legislature has served since 1972. House members are elected every two years, while Senate members are elected every four years.

Party summary

State Senate

House of Representatives

History

Notes

References

External links

New Mexico Legislature official website

 
Government of New Mexico
Bicameral legislatures